Leo Carrillo (1881–1961) was an American cartoonist, a comedian in vaudeville, and an actor on stage, film and television. He was best known in the United States as the Cisco Kid's sidekick Pancho on 1950s children's television, a role which capped a long show business career that began decades earlier.

Growing up in culturally diverse Los Angeles, Carrillo was conversant in five languages with a keen ear for dialects. When he went to work for the San Francisco Examiner as a cartoonist, he began performing humorous monologues on the San Francisco stage, easily transforming himself into a variety of personas. Soon he began working in vaudeville with Major Bowes, and toured the Orpheum Circuit with Walter C. Kelly. Theatrical producer Oliver Morosco offered him a role in the original Broadway play  Upstairs and Down in 1916, and within a year, he landed the title role in  Lombardi, Ltd. For the next decade he performed on the vaudeville circuit in between acting in Broadway productions. A 1927 touring revival production of Lombardi, Ltd., again featured Carrillo in the lead, and began at George M. Cohan's Theatre before going on the road.

Carrillo's first screen appearances were in 1927 Vitaphone shorts. In the early decades of his film career, he was often the starring lead. And while he played many different ethnic roles, or characters with no discernible ethnicity, he was often cast as Italian or Hispanic.  He played everything from the hero to the villain, in straight dramatic parts as well as appearing in light comedy and musical films.  Over the course of his movie career, Carrillo appeared in over 80 feature-length films, ending in 1950 with Pancho Villa Returns. He was 68 years old when he first teamed with Duncan Renaldo to co-star in five Cisco Kid movies in 1949–1950. The ensuing popular The Cisco Kid television series ran for 156 episodes 1950–1956.

For his contributions to the entertainment industry, Carrillo received two stars on the Hollywood Walk of Fame on February 8, 1960 . The star for his contributions to motion pictures is located at 1635 Vine Street, and the star for his television work is a block away at 1517 Vine Street.

Stage

Television

Films

Film shorts

Feature and serial films

See also
 The Cisco Kid
 Duncan Renaldo filmography

Notes

Footnotes

Citations

References

External links
 

Male actor filmographies
American filmographies